Cyfrwy is a subsidiary summit of Cadair Idris in the Snowdonia National Park, in Gwynedd, northwest Wales. It lies to the west of Cadair Idris and is often climbed with Cadair Idris by taking the Pony Path.

The summit is bare and rocky and marked with a cairn. The north and east face has large cliffs. A rock climb/extreme scramble known as the Cyfrwy Arete is found here. This arete is very steep and rope and rock climbing skills will be needed.  To the west is Tyrrau Mawr and Craig-y-llyn, while to the south is Craig Cwm Amarch.

References

External links

Arthog
Llanfihangel-y-Pennant
Mountains and hills of Gwynedd
Mountains and hills of Snowdonia
Climbing areas of Wales
Hewitts of Wales
Nuttalls